Bazuk-e Malek (also Romanized as Bāzūk-e Malek) is a village in Sakhvid Rural District, Nir District, Taft County, Yazd Province, Iran. At the 2006 census, its population was 27, in 9 families.

References 

Populated places in Taft County